Sudhar Prem (Sudha's Love) is a 1950 Indian Bengali film directed by Premankur Atorthy. Produced by New Theatres the music was composed by Pranab Dey. The cinematography was by Prabhat Ghosh and Prabhodh Das. The cast included Asit Baran, Manoranjan Bhattacharya, Lila Dasgupta, Sandhya Devi and Shyam Laha.

Cast
 Asit Baran
 Manoranjan Bhattacharya
 Lila Dasgupta
 Sandhya Devi
 Shyam Laha
 Haren Mukherjee
 Naresh Mitra
 Khagen Pathak
 Haridhan Mukherjee
 Kali Sarkar

References

External links

1950 films
Bengali-language Indian films
1950s Bengali-language films
Films directed by Premankur Atorthy